In some Southern European and Latin American countries University Militias were military units for training university students.

Cuba 
A University Militia known as the José Antonio Echeverría Brigade was formed in 1959, which later became the 154th Battalion of the National Revolutionary Militias.  The unit is now known as the 154th Regiment of the Territorial Troops Militias.

Italy 
The University Militia was a branch of the Voluntary Militia for National Security, and had the same missions and functions.

History
The first groups were formed in 1925, and in 1929 they were united and placed under the control of and Inspectorate General based in Rome.  By September 1931, it was a separate organization composed of five legions.

Uniform
The national staff of the University Militia wore the gray-green uniform of the MVSN.  Their alpine hat had no tassel or feather, and had a black band and black piping.

Spain 
The University Militias, IMEC, are a method to fulfill compulsory military service in Spain.  In it, militiamen undergo military training in the Reserves until the drill of the militia is professional.

It consists of university-level students completing compulsory military service as officers (second lieutenant) or non-commissioned officers (sergeant) of the reserves, receiving military training in three periods (6 months in the first year, three months the two following years).

To be able to apply for training and to become an officer or non-commissioned officer on the reserve list the first two years of university courses that were attended must be passed and medical, physical, and psychotechnical tests commensurate with the rank must be passed.

There exists one independently for each of the three services:  Army, Navy (IMECAR), and Air Force.

History 

According to José Ignacio Ripol de Churruca, a Spanish reserve marine infantry lieutenant, University Militias were created as a result of the outbreak of the War of Independence, and the consequent large number of casualties sustained among ensigns and lieutenants of the officer corps of the regular army.  The far-seeing person who saw the way to fill in these gaps, was Gil de Bernabé, Colonel of Artillery and Director of the Academy of Segovia.  The quarry which Gil de Bernabé used to fill these gaps among the cadre of professionals was the university students, whose intellectual training made them suitable to be assimilated quickly and, after an accelerated course, for the duties of an officer in combat.

The Colonel depended on three sources.  First, the students of the University of Toledo who facing the imminent danger of the city falling into the hands of the French left on foot, with their professors at the lead, leaving for Segovia, a city still not occupied, where it positioned itself and named itself the Literary Battalion. Second, the Maestrantes de Ronda, good horsemen skilled in the use of the sword, and lastly, the cadets of Segovia who followed their Colonel and who it is certain, by his training, found themselves quickly taken on by the Army of the South.

Gil de Bernabé with the force of this human capital presented to the Defense Board in Cadiz a project whose most outstanding paragraph is that which reads: "Utilize as a quarry the 15,000 bachelor, licentiate, and doctoral students and even professors to be able to produce 8,000 subaltern officers, if chiefs and even generals are not included."

The Navy offered the installations of its Naval Academy in San Fernando to form that which was called the "National and Patriotic Military Academy".  In it were trained infantry, cavalry, artillery and engineer officers.

Once the siege of Cadiz was raised the Academy languished.  As it has been said before nobody remembers when Santa Bárbara ceased to thunder.  It remained definitely closed in Granada, where it moved to, in 1823.

From this date nobody could remember the subject anymore until the Royal Order of 29 July 1918 created the figure of the reserve officer, because of the excellent results that civilian graduates had given in the belligerent armies during World War I (1914-1918).  The majority of Spaniards who adopted this system to do compulsory military service and to take the commission of ensign, had the privilege of choosing Branch and Regiment and also the city, which would be his residence.

During the Civil War academies were created on both sides to train ensigns, who in the Nationalist zone, received provisional grades, at its conclusion at the end of the struggle both lost their status.  The star was not sewn on the cuff, but upon the black taffeta which was worn on the left side of the jacket and over the heart.

In 1940 the creation of the University Militias was promulgated, by law, entry into which was open to:  "All students over 18 years old who attend courses in the different faculties, Technical Schools and any other teaching institution which confers degrees of duly recognized superior character."  The first class of the army graduated in 1942, that of the Navy in 1944 and that of the Air Force in 1948.  In 1972 this service suffered a restructuring initiating the Military Instruction for the training of the Reserve List period and much more recently the latest reform came under the name Command Cadre Training Service where a few, previously chosen for their academic record, had the privilege to become ensigns in these Arms for them to prove by their studies a better aptitude and found themselves accommodated in the assigned quotas to be able to serve the Army, Navy or Air Force.

From 1992 Spain belonged to the Interallied Confederation of Reserve Officers and the Interallied Confederation of Medical Reserve Officers.  They meet twice a year, first, in Brussels during winter and then in rotating turns among member nations.  In 2001 they met in Spain:  Madrid and Toledo.  In the former the work sessions took place in the Center for Advanced National Defense Studies and in the latter the new classes participated in military competitions at the Infantry Academy.  In total 1,114 delegates came among them Generals, Chiefs and Officers of 30 European and American Nations.

The emergence of the professional armies erased with a bureaucratic stroke of the pen all possibility of serving the country in double capacity civilian and military, becoming double citizens—twice a citizen—as Winston Churchill called them.

The law which stopped the promulgation and which regulated the future forces of the Reserves, did not give the opportunity to be able, like in other nations of the Western World, to be an Officer, working as a civilian, being able to be promoted in his military role, by means of courses or trainings, which the State gave as an incentive for businesses to be able to dispense with their co-workers for short periods of time, during which the said could dedicate themselves to their second occupation.

Although Spaniards trace the beginnings of University Militias to the early 19th century, in 1762 in the Philippines, at that time a Spanish colony, four companies were raised from volunteer students of the University of Santo Tomás, a colonial college, to fight the British invasion of the colonial capital Manila.  These military units were organized again in 1780 as militia companies, which were part of the Spanish colonial army and which existed until 1785.

Venezuela 
The Bolivarian University Militias.

In popular culture 
 15 bajo la lona (1959) is a comedy about fifteen college students in a Spanish reserve military training program.

See also 
 Academic battalion

References 
 Alía Plana, Jesús María. El Ejército Español en Filipinas: El Periodo Romántico. Madrid: Tabapress, 1993.
 Asociación de Veteranos de la Milicia Universitaria del Ejército de Tierra de España

External links 
 Asociación de Veteranos de la Milicia Universitaria del Ejército de Tierra de España, Association of Veterans of the University Militia of the Army of Spain
 Asociación Milicias Navales Universitarias, Naval University Militias Association
 Fundación M.A.U. "VARA de REY", Vara de Rey A.F.U.M. Foundation
 Milicia Aérea Universitaria, Air Force University Militia
 Unión Nacional de Antiguos Oficiales y Suboficiales de las Milicias Universitarias, National Union of Former Officers and Non-Commissioned Officers of the University Militias
 Breve Historia de la Milicia Universitaria, by Francisco Martínez Pedraja

Military organization